Patrick Gallo (born February 26, 1973) is an American actor. He portrayed Anthony Giacalone in Martin Scorsese's The Irishman.

Filmography

Film

Television

References

External links
 

1973 births
Living people
American male film actors
21st-century American male actors